Gillian O'Connor (11 August 1941 - 3 April 2016) was a British journalist, and the editor of the Investors Chronicle from 1982 to 1994.

References

1941 births
2016 deaths
British journalists
British magazine editors